George W. Smith was a Scottish footballer who played as a full back in the English Football League in the 1920s and 1930s.

Born in Parkhead, Glasgow, he started out with his local side Parkhead F.C., before enjoying a long career with Chelsea.

Smith joined Chelsea in 1921 and went on to play 351 league matches for them (370 in all senior games) until 1932. Whilst at the club, he played in three FA Cup games where Chelsea defeated opposition from a higher league.

After leaving Chelsea he played for Scottish side East Fife for a matter of a few months.

References

Year of birth missing
Year of death missing
Footballers from Glasgow
Association football defenders
English Football League players
Scottish Football League players
Chelsea F.C. players
East Fife F.C. players
Parkhead F.C. players
Scottish footballers
Scottish Junior Football Association players